Bring the Family is John Hiatt's eighth album.  It was his first album to chart on the Billboard 200, and featured his first single entry on the mainstream rock chart with "Thank You Girl".  It features Ry Cooder on guitar, Nick Lowe on bass guitar and Jim Keltner on drums.  The four would later reform as Little Village and release an album in 1992.  "Thing Called Love" later became a hit for Bonnie Raitt, and "Have A Little Faith In Me" is among Hiatt's most popular songs, although it wasn't released as a single in America.

The album was recorded in four days after McCabe's Guitar Shop booker John Chelew convinced Hiatt that these were some of his best songs. Hiatt was recently sober but had burned so many bridges in the music industry he did not think he had a chance of continuing. He had been dropped by his label and "wondered if I was worth a damn". Hiatt had played some solo acoustic shows at McCabe's in January 1987 just prior to recording where he debuted songs such as "Lipstick Sunset", "Your Dad Did" and "Memphis in the Meantime".

Demon Records in England still loved his work and had pledged about $30,000 if he wanted to record ("Demon Records said I sing in the shower and they'd put it out," Hiatt says. He later told the Rocky Mountain News that Demon would release an album "if I farted in a bathtub"). A&M Records in the U.S. eventually picked up the finished disc. Recording was done in Studio 2 of Ocean Way Studios, Los Angeles over four days, using direct metal mastering. These songs were all that were recorded – there were no leftovers or outtakes and Hiatt had to complete a couple of songs in the studio. "I remember Ry walking out the door on the fourth day and me coming after him and going: 'Ry, I've got one more song. Could you stay?' Literally, we'd done nine and I needed one more," Hiatt has said. Budgets were so tight that Hiatt and Lowe shared a Holiday Inn room in the San Fernando Valley during the recording sessions. Lowe, an old friend of Hiatt's, took no payment for his contribution.  Chelew's prediction turned out to be correct. Bring the Family is one of the cornerstones of Hiatt's career, a critical and financial success, and not a Hiatt performance goes by without a generous helping of its songs.

'Alone In The Dark' was featured in the 1994 James Cameron film True Lies, in a memorable scene where Jamie Lee Curtis dances to the song.

Track listing
All tracks written by John Hiatt

"Memphis in the Meantime" – 4:00
"Alone in the Dark" – 4:46
"Thing Called Love" – 4:13
"Lipstick Sunset" – 4:14
"Have a Little Faith in Me" – 4:05
"Thank You Girl" – 4:11
"Tip of My Tongue" – 5:54
"Your Dad Did" – 4:03
"Stood Up" – 6:01
"Learning How to Love You" – 4:06

Charts

Personnel
John Hiatt - Acoustic guitar, vocals, Piano on "Have a Little Faith in Me"
Ry Cooder - Electric guitar, Harmony on "Thing Called Love", Sitar on "Your Dad Did"
Jim Keltner - drums
Nick Lowe - Bass guitar, Harmony on "Learning How To Love You"
John Chelew - Production
Larry Hirsch - Recording, Engineering
Joe Schiff - Engineering, Mixing
Jeffrey Gold - Art direction
Michael Hodgson - Art direction, Design
Steven M. Martin - Photographs

References

1987 albums
John Hiatt albums
A&M Records albums